The Jardín Botánico Clavijero ( Clavijero Botanical Garden ) is an important botanical garden in the city of Xalapa, Veracruz, Mexico. The garden is dedicated to Francisco Javier Clavijero, who was a Novohispano Jesuit teacher, scholar and historian.

Description
The Clavijero Botanical Garden has a collection of regional plants with sections dedicated to Mexican ornamental flowers, reconstructed mountain environments in Xalapa, ferns and pines.

References

External links
Botanical Gardens Conservation International

Botanical gardens in Mexico
Xalapa
Natural history of Veracruz
Nature conservation in Mexico
Parks in Mexico
Tourist attractions in Veracruz
Geography of Veracruz